The following is a list of the 277 communes of the Finistère department of France.

The communes cooperate in the following intercommunalities (as of 2022):
Brest Métropole
CA Concarneau Cornouaille Agglomération
Communauté d'agglomération du Pays de Landerneau-Daoulas
CA Morlaix Communauté
Communauté d'agglomération Quimper Bretagne Occidentale
CA Quimperlé Communauté
Communauté de communes Cap Sizun - Pointe du Raz
CC Douarnenez Communauté
Communauté de communes de Haute Cornouaille
CC Haut-Léon Communauté
Communauté de communes du Haut Pays Bigouden
CC Communauté Lesneven Côte des Légendes
CC Monts d'Arrée Communauté
Communauté de communes du Pays Bigouden Sud
Communauté de communes du Pays de Landivisiau
Communauté de communes du Pays des Abers
Communauté de communes du Pays Fouesnantais
Communauté de communes du Pays d'Iroise
Communauté de communes Pleyben-Châteaulin-Porzay
CC Poher communauté (partly)
Communauté de communes Presqu'île de Crozon-Aulne maritime

References

Finistere